Baba Roshan Jurangpathy (born 25 June 1967) is a Sri Lankan former Test cricketer. He played his debut Test against India in 1985 at Asgiriya Stadium. India's Mohinder Amarnath was his only Test wicket. He played in only two Test matches, and finished his career with a batting average of 0.25.

References

External links

1967 births
Colombo Cricket Club cricketers
Living people
Sri Lankan cricketers
Sri Lankan Malays
Sri Lanka Test cricketers